International Migration Review is a quarterly peer-reviewed academic journal published by SAGE Publications on behalf of the Center for Migration Studies of New York. The journal was established in 1964 as International Migration Digest. The current editor-in-chief is Jamie Winders, professor of sociology at Syracuse University. The journal covers all aspects of international population movements, including human migration, ethnic group relations, and refugee movements.  

According to the Journal Citation Reports, the journal has a 2016 Impact Factor of 2.195 and a five-year Impact Factor of 2.114.

References

External links 
 

SAGE Publishing academic journals
English-language journals
Publications established in 1964
Quarterly journals
Sociology journals
Demography journals